Bockhampton is an abandoned village in Berkshire that was enclosed in the late 18th century. Situated on the River Lambourn southeast and downstream of Lambourn it was also known as Lower Lambourn, as opposed to Upper Lambourn which is upstream. Bockhampton was mentioned in the Domesday Book of 1086 as "Bochentone: Ralph the earl's son; Odo and Edward, king's thanes. Mill." who held the land in return for keeping the King's harriers. Bockhampton Manor House was built in the 16th Century by Thomas Blagrave (and subsequently rebuilt in the 17th and 18th Centuries) and absorbed the three old manors of East Bockhampton, West Bockhampton and Hoppeshortland. The village was uprooted and the land enclosed in 1776 thanks to the 1773 Inclosure Act, as sheep farming proved to be more profitable than tillage. There is a road sign for Bockhampton on the Newbury Road pointing down Bockhampton Road towards the old site of the village in the sheep pasture next to the electric substation.

References

Deserted medieval villages in England
West Berkshire District